Bhandari or Bhandary or Bhanderi is a surname found in various Hindu castes and communities in India and Nepal. Bhandari or Bhanderi means treasurer, keeper of a storehouse. In Punjab, Bhandaris belong to the Khatri caste. In Nepal, the surname is used by both bhramins and Tagadhari Chhetris.

Notable people 
Notable people bearing the name Bhandari or Bhandary include:

Amit Bhandari (born 1978), Indian cricketer
Anup Bhandari, Indian writer, director, music director, lyricist, playback singer and actor
Bidhya Devi Bhandari, Nepalese politician, President of Nepal
Binod Bhandari (born 1990), Nepalese cricketer
Damodar Bhandari, member of 2nd Nepalese Constituent Assembly
Dhruv Bhandari (born 1985), Indian television actor
Dil Kumari Bhandari (born 1949), Indian politician, former president of Bharatiya Gorkha Parisangh
Dinesh Chandra Bhandary, Group Captain in the Indian Air Force, the Vir Chakra awardee
Gagan Singh Bhandari, Nepalese politician and General 
H. Gopal Bhandary (born 1950), MLA in Karnataka
Lalit Bhandari (born 1996), Nepalese cricketer
Madan Bhandari, Nepalese politician and communist leader
Mohan Bhandari (1937–2015), Indian film and television actor
Nar Bahadur Bhandari (1947–2017), Indian politician, Chief Minister of Sikkim from 1979 to 1994 and founder of Sikkim Sangram Parishad
Rajendra Bhandari (born 1956), Nepalese poet
Rajendra Bahadur Bhandari, Nepalese athlete
Sabitra Bhandari, Nepalese national footballer
Tika Bhandari, Nepalese singer

Fictional people bearing the name Bhandari include:
Sav Bhandari and Alli Bhandari, two main characters and siblings on the Canadian teen drama Degrassi (2001–15)

References 

Surnames of Indian origin
Surnames of Nepalese origin
Khas surnames
Khatri surnames